Hugh Bolton (born 15 November 1879) was a Scottish footballer who played mainly as an inside right for Port Glasgow Athletic, Newcastle United, Everton, Bradford (Park Avenue), Morton, Glentoran and Johnstone.

He had moved from hometown team Port Glasgow to English football with Newcastle in 1905, but only played one Football League match for the Magpies before moving to Everton in January 1906. Not only was his debut for his new club against his former employers, but he faced them again four months later in the 1906 FA Cup Final, which Everton won 1–0. He lost his place in the team to fellow Scot George Wilson for much of the following season but was re-instated when Wilson became involved in a dispute over his contract, and it was Bolton who played in the 1907 FA Cup Final, this time resulting in a defeat to The Wednesday. A Toffees regular in the next campaign but out of favour in the next, he moved on to Bradford at the turn of 1909.

After returning to the west of Scotland with Morton in September 1910, he spent time in Ireland with Glentoran while on the 'open to transfer' list, then finished his career with Johnstone.

References

1879 births
Year of death unknown
Scottish footballers
Footballers from Inverclyde
People from Port Glasgow
Greenock Morton F.C. players
Johnstone F.C. players
Bradford (Park Avenue) A.F.C. players
Port Glasgow Athletic Juniors F.C. players
Port Glasgow Athletic F.C. players
Everton F.C. players
Glentoran F.C. players
Newcastle United F.C. players
Scottish Junior Football Association players
Scotland junior international footballers
Scottish Football League players
English Football League players
NIFL Premiership players
Association football inside forwards
Scottish emigrants to the United States
FA Cup Final players